A whitesmith is a metalworker who does finishing work on iron and steel such as filing, lathing, burnishing or polishing. The term also refers to a person who works with "white" or light-coloured metals, and is sometimes used as a synonym for tinsmith.

History
The first known description of Whitesmith is from 1686:  

Whitesmithing developed as a speciality of blacksmithing in the 1700s, when extra time was given to filing and polishing certain products. In 1836 the trade was described by Isaac Taylor:

Process
The principal manual skills of the whitesmith were in filing and turning (the use of lathes). Using cross-cut files the whitesmith could achieve a flat, smooth finish on iron or steel products where the less skilled might only achieve a convex effect. For very large items, the whitesmith might even file when red hot using a two-person operated float file.

This profession is also related to a bell hanger and locksmith as they perform much file work. In Great Britain  this type of worker was affiliated with a union. The Amalgamated Society of Whitesmiths was founded in 1889. It was renamed the Amalgamated Society of Whitesmiths, Locksmiths, Bell-hangers, Domestic Engineers, Art Metal Workers and General Iron Fitters in 1891, the Amalgamated Society of Whitesmiths, Locksmiths, Bell-hangers, Domestic Engineers, Art Metal Workers and General Iron and Pipe Fitters in 1894, and the Amalgamated Society of Whitesmiths, Domestic Engineers and General Pipe Fitters in 1904. In 1908 it merged with the Amalgamated Society of Kitchen Range, Stove Grate, Gas Stove, Hot Water, Art Metal and other Smiths and Fitters connected with the above Trades, the Amalgamated Society of Kitchen Range, Hot Water and General Fitters and the Birmingham Society of Hot Water and Steam Engineers to form the National Union of Operative Heating and Domestic Engineers, Whitesmiths and General Iron Workers

Products
James Watt employed a whitesmith in the 1760s when working on his experimental steam engine. The first cylinder was made by this whitesmith using hammered iron and solder. Although this technique proved insufficient, when this whitesmith died soon after Watt wrote to John Roebuck greatly lamenting the loss of his "white iron man".

With the industrial revolution, in the same way that many blacksmiths became specialised as farriers making horse shoes, so many whitesmiths became lorimers making spurs, stirrups, bridle bits and buckles.

Typically whitesmiths made products that either required a decorative finish such as fire grates, or that needed cold-working such as screws and lathed machine parts.

References

Metalsmiths